Dasht Daman (also Romanized as Dasht Dāman ٫ Dasht Dooman) is a village in Khoshabar Rural District, Rezvanshahr city, Rezvanshahr County, Gilan Province, Iran. At the 2006 census, its population was 25, in 7 families.

References 

Populated places in Rezvanshahr County